Adam Clawson (28 December 1972 – 10 July 2017) was an American slalom canoeist who competed at the international level from 1988 to 1996.

He won two medals at the 1991 ICF Canoe Slalom World Championships in Tacen with a gold in the C1 team event and a silver in the C1 event.

Clawson also competed in two Summer Olympics, earning his best finish of 19th in the C1 event in Atlanta in 1996.

Clawson was born in Salt Lake City. He died in Whittier, North Carolina.

World Cup individual podiums

References

ICF medalists for Olympic and World Championships - Part 2: rest of flatwater (now sprint) and remaining canoeing disciplines: 1936-2007.

1972 births
2017 deaths
American male canoeists
Canoeists at the 1992 Summer Olympics
Canoeists at the 1996 Summer Olympics
Olympic canoeists of the United States
Sportspeople from Salt Lake City
Medalists at the ICF Canoe Slalom World Championships